Breanna, Breanne, Briana, Briána, Brianna, Brianne may refer to:

People
Brianna, a feminine given name
Brianna Perry, American rapper who also performs under the mononym Brianna.

Fictional people
Breanna
Breanna Barnes (One on One character)
Breanna Timmins or Bree Timmins, fictional character on the popular Australian soap opera Neighbours
Brianna
Brianna (Inkworld), Dustfinger's daughter in the Inkworld trilogy
 The "Last Handmaiden" on a Jedi Academy located on Telos IV in Star Wars: Knights of the Old Republic II – The Sith Lords

Places
Llyn Brianne, a man-made lake or reservoir in the headwaters of the River Tywi in central Wales.

Other uses
Briána (Barbus prespensis), a species of ray-finned fish in the family Cyprinidae

See also
Breona (disambiguation)
Bree (disambiguation)
Brian (disambiguation)